The 2000 Tour of the Basque Country (Spanish: Vuelta al País Vasco) was the 40th edition of the Tour of the Basque Country cycle race and was held from 3 April to 7 April 2000. The race started in Oñati and finished at Madarixa. The race was won by Andreas Klöden of the Telekom team.

General classification

References

2000
Bas